A list of films produced in Egypt in 1992. For an A-Z list of films currently on Wikipedia, see :Category:Egyptian films.

External links
 Egyptian films of 1992 at the Internet Movie Database
 Egyptian films of 1992 elCinema.com

Lists of Egyptian films by year
1992 in Egypt
Lists of 1992 films by country or language